"Liberating Alaska" is an alternate history short story  by Harry Turtledove, published  in the July/August 2018 issue of the  Isaac Asimov's Science Fiction Magazine.

Plot summary
The point of divergence occurs when the United States never purchases Alaska from Russia. As a result, Alaska remains under Russian control until the Russian Civil War. As a consequence of the Allied intervention in the Russian Civil War and the U.S. fighting the Red Army in Siberia, Vladimir Lenin is forced to cede Alaska to the U.S.

The story is set in June 1929. Joseph Stalin initiates a take-over of the city of Siknazuak (real-life Nome, Alaska with a variant of its Iñupiat name). The story depicts the liberation of Siknazuak by the United States Marine Corps.

References

2018 short stories
Short stories by Harry Turtledove
Works originally published in Asimov's Science Fiction
Fiction set in 1929
Alaska in fiction
Cultural depictions of Joseph Stalin
Alternate history short stories